Épineu-le-Chevreuil is a commune in the Sarthe department in the Pays de la Loire region in north-western France.

Geography
The river Vègre flows southwestward through the eastern part of the commune, then forms part of its southern border.

See also
Communes of the Sarthe department

References

Communes of Sarthe